Cereus hexagonus or lady of the night cactus is a species of columnar cactus found in Ecuador and Venezuela.

References

External links
 
 

hexagonus
Taxa named by Philip Miller